Don't Let It Go to Waste is the debut album from Matt Willis, released on 20 November 2006. The track "Who You Gonna Run To" features Imogen Heap on vocals.

Track listing

Personnel 
Alex Clarke - Pro Tools
Brio Taliaferro - Additional Programming
Damon Wilson – Songwriting, Drums
Daniel Carter - Songwriting
Imogen Heap – Backing Vocals on Track 8
James Hockley - Vocoder on Track 4
Jason Perry – Songwriting, Producer, Engineer
Jeremy Wheatly - Mixing
John Kwiecinski - Songwriting
Julian Emery - Songwriting, Producer, Engineer
Matt Prime - Songwriting
Matt Willis – Songwriting & Vocals
Rick Parfitt Jr - Songwriting
Richard Edgeler - Assistant Mixing
Terry Emery - Percussion on Track 6

Promo & touring band 

Drums - Damon Wilson, (Richie Mills - Crash Video/Era
Bass - Daniel Carter, (Jimmy Sims - Crash Video/Era
Guitar (Main) - Van, (Nick Tsang - Crash Video/Era
Guitar - Alex Clarke
Keys - Chris Banks

Chart performance

References

2006 debut albums
Matt Willis albums
Albums produced by David Bendeth
Albums produced by Jason Perry
Mercury Records albums